Lukas Webb (born 4 March 1996) is a professional Australian rules footballer who played for the Western Bulldogs in the Australian Football League (AFL).

Webb was drafted with pick 27 of the 2014 National Draft. He made his debut against  in round 3 of the 2015 season.

Webb was delisted at the end of the 2019 season.

References

External links

1996 births
Living people
Western Bulldogs players
Gippsland Power players
Southport Australian Football Club players
Australian rules footballers from Victoria (Australia)